Irianopus is a genus of mites in the family Acaridae.

Species
 Irianopus brevis Fain, 1986

References

Acaridae